Malcolm Robert Sygrove (born 17 February 1966) is an English former first-class cricketer.

Sygrove was born in February 1966 at Lutterworth, Leicestershire. He later studied at St John's College, Oxford where he played first-class cricket for Oxford University. He made his debut against Lancashire at Oxford in 1986. He played first-class cricket for Oxford until 1988, making eight appearances. Playing as a right-arm medium pace bowler, he took 20 wickets in his eight matches, at an average of 46.65 and best figures of 3 for 91.

References

External links

1966 births
Living people
People from Lutterworth
Cricketers from Leicestershire
Alumni of St John's College, Oxford
English cricketers
Oxford University cricketers